David McClelland (born 25 December 1941) is an English former footballer who played for Bishop Auckland, Port Vale, and Wellington Town in the 1960s.

Career
McClelland played for Bishop Auckland before having a successful trial with Stanley Matthews' Fourth Division side Port Vale, which resulting in him signing a permanent deal with the club in August 1967. With just two substitute and two full appearances at Vale Park during the 1967–68 season, he was given a free transfer in April 1968 to non-league Wellington Town. In later life he took up residence in Sidmouth, Devon.

Career statistics
Source:

References

1941 births
Living people
Footballers from Newcastle upon Tyne
People from Sidmouth
Association football wingers
English footballers
Port Vale F.C. players
Telford United F.C. players
English Football League players